Seven Hours to Judgment is a 1988 film directed by and starring Beau Bridges. It was produced by Mort Abrahams and written by Walter Davis and Steven E. de Souza (under his pseudonym Elliot Stephens). The film also stars Ron Leibman and Julianne Phillips.

Cast

Notes

External links 
 
 
 
 

1988 films
1988 drama films
American drama films
Films set in Seattle
Films scored by John Debney
1980s English-language films
1980s American films